Beyond the Rockies is a 1932 American Pre-Code Western film directed by Fred Allen and written by Oliver Drake. The film stars Tom Keene, Rochelle Hudson, Marie Wells, Julian Rivero and Ernie Adams. The film was released on July 8, 1932, by RKO Pictures.

Plot
Noted gunman Black Jack and his friends arrive and take jobs on the Allen ranch. Allen's hands have quit and his cattle are being rustled. When one of Black Jack's friends is killed by the rustlers, he finds the killer and when they fight his Marshal's badge drops out and Ruby, the leader of the rustlers, picks it up. With his identity now known she sets a trap for him.

Cast 
 Tom Keene as Blackjack
 Rochelle Hudson as Betty Allen
 Marie Wells as Ruby Sherman
 Julian Rivero as Lavender Joe
 Ernie Adams as Blinky
 Hank Bell as Whiskey Bill
 William Welsh as John Allen
 Tom London as Kirk Tracy
 Ted Adams as Emory

References

External links 
 
 
 
 

1932 films
American black-and-white films
RKO Pictures films
American Western (genre) films
1932 Western (genre) films
Films directed by Fred Allen (film editor)
1930s English-language films
1930s American films